AFL Victoria Country is an Australian rules football governing body with jurisdiction over the state of Victoria outside metropolitan Melbourne on behalf of AFL Victoria. As well as administering and promoting the code in the regions, it often arbitrates disputes in areas such as player clearances and club movements between country leagues, and may also be called upon as a higher authority of appeal. The organisation was formed as a result of a merger between Victorian Country Football League (VCFL) and AFL Victoria in November 2012.

The then-VCFL aired telecasts beginning in 2010 on C31 Melbourne, along with Geelong Football League and Geelong & District Football League. The women's netball coverage also was broadcast on community TV in 2010.

Victorian Country Championships
The VCFL originally organised the interleague Victorian Country Football Championships back in 1954. 

In 1958, the VCFL initiated the Centenary Championships, to mark the 100th anniversary of the inception of Australian Rules football. The 15 major leagues of Victoria and southern NSW were divided into four districts, with each pool conducting a championships.

Caltex had the naming rights of the Victorian Country Championships matches in the 1960's. The 16 league series would run over a two year period, with knock out matches in the first season, followed by semi finals and a grand final in the following season. 

The Country Championship were discontinued from 1975 before being re-established in 1978. 

From 2004 to 2006 the championships were decided at a carnival round-robin competition at one venue over a single weekend, with each of the four sides playing the others in matches of two twenty-minute halves. The team on top of the ladder, based on points (4 for a win, 2 for a draw) and then percentage (points scored over points conceded) after these three matches, were declared the winner. Leagues not represented in the top four pools of four participated in other interleague matches organised by the VCFL. In 2007, there was no statewide VCFL Championships, just a rivalry round was played between close by leagues, (with the O&MFL playing the GVFL), with the round robin format returning in 2008.

In 2009, the championships reverted to head-to-head full matches on a rankings scale per year.

The Ash - Wilson Trophy was formed in 2001 and is only for matches involving the Goulburn Valley Football League and the Ovens & Murray Football League, In honour of former players, Stephen Ash and Mick Wilson.

VCFL - Division 1 Champions

1954: Ovens & Murray FL d Bendigo FL at Ballarat
1955: Ovens & Murray FL d Ballarat FL at Albury
1956: Ballarat FL d Ovens & Murray FL at Bendigo
1957: Ovens & Murray FL d Ballarat FL at Albury
1958: ?
1959: ?
1960: ?
1961/62: Bendigo FL d Wimmera FL at Horsham
1963/64: South Western DFL (Riverina) d Hampden FL at Narrandera
1965/66: Hampden FL d Ovens & Murray FL at Wangaratta
1967/68: Ovens & Murray FL d Wimmera FL at Horsham
1969/70: Hampden FL d Ovens & Murray FL
1971/72: Bendigo FL d Murray FL at Cobram
1973/74: North Central FL d Hampden FL
1975: VCFL Country Championships discontinued in 1975. Re-established in 1978.
1976: N/A
1977: N/A
1978: Goulburn Valley FL d Hampden FL at Colac.
1979: Latrobe Valley FL d Bendigo FL at Bendigo
1980: Latrobe Valley FL d Ovens & Murray FL at Sale
1981: Ballarat FL
1982: Ballarat FL d Ovens & Murray FL
1983: Ballarat FL
1984: Goulburn Valley FL d Geelong FL
1985: Ovens & Murray FL d Ballarat FL at Wangaratta
1986: Ballarat FL 
1987: Ovens & Murray FL d Sunraysia FL at Mildura
1988: Geelong FL d Bendigo FL at Geelong
1989: Bendigo FL d Geelong FL at Bendigo
1990: Latrobe Valley FL d Bendigo FL at Sale
1991: Hampden FL d Geelong FL
1992: Geelong FL d LaTrobe FL at Geelong
1993: Geelong FL d Bendigo FL at Bendigo
1994: Goulburn Valley FL d ?
1995: Gippsland Latrobe FL d Mid Murray FL at Swan Hill
1996: Ovens & Murray FL d Geelong FL at Wodonga
1997: Ovens & Murray FL d Geelong FL at Geelong
1998: Ovens & Murray FL d Geelong FL at Wodonga
1999: Ovens & Murray FL d Gippsland LaTrobe FL at Moe
2000: Geelong FL d Gippsland Latrobe FL at Geelong
2001: Ovens & Murray FL d Goulburn Valley FL at Lavington, NSW
2002: Mornington Peninsula Nepean FL d Hampden FL
2003: Geelong FL d Goulburn Valley FL at Shepparton
2004: 1st: Geelong FL at Shepparton
2005: 1st: Goulburn Valley FL at Kardinia Park, Geelong
2006: 1st: Ovens & Murray FL at Lavington Sports Ground, NSW
2007: No VCFL Championships in 2007. A rivalry round was played.
2008: 1st: Ovens & Murray FL at Shepparton
2009: Ovens & Murray defeated Goulburn Valley FL at Shepparton
2010: Goulburn Valley FL defeated Ovens & Murray FL at Lavington
2011: Goulburn Valley FL defeated Ballarat FL at Shepparton 
2012: Goulburn Valley FL defeated Mornington Peninsula FL at Shepparton
2013: Geelong FL defeated Goulburn Valley FL at Geelong
2014: Geelong FL defeated Peninsula FL at Geelong
2015: Geelong FL defeated Goulburn Valley FL at Shepparton
2016: Geelong FL defeated Eastern FL at Geelong
2017: Geelong FL defeated Mornington Peninsula Nepean FL at MCG, Jolimont
2018: Eastern FL defeated Geelong FL at Etihad Stadium, Melbourne
2019: Northern FL d Geelong FL at KFC Oval, Geelong

Most Division 1 Country Championship wins / Runners Up

*Country Championships: Division 2

1984 - Riverina FL: 12.11 - 83 d West Gippsland: 8.12 - 60
1985 - Western Border FL
1986 - Sunraysia FL
1987 - Western Border FL
1988 - Wimmera FL
1989 - Hampden FL
1990 - Riverina FL d North Central
1991 - Ballarat FL
1992 - Mid Murray FL
1993 - Hampden FL
1994 - Ovens & Murray FL d North Central FL
1995 - Ballarat FL
1996 - Murray FL
1997 - Mornington Peninsula Nepean FL
1998 - Western Border FL
1999 - West Gippsland FL
2000 - Bendigo FL
2001 - Ballarat FL d Central Murray FL
2002 - Bendigo FL d Central Murray FL
2003 - Ballarat FL d Central Murray FL
2004 - Ballarat FL
2005 - West Gippsland LaTrobe FL
2006 - Hampden FL

*Country Championships: Division 3
1994 - Bellarine FL
1995 - Riddell FL
2004 - Wimmera FL
2005 - Bellarine FL
2006 - Bendigo FL

*Country Championships: Division 4 / Pool D
2004 - Bellarine FL
2005 - Murray FL
2006 - Sunraysia FL

Representative Sides
On occasion, a Victoria Country representative side may be selected to play in one-off fixtures against other representative teams such as interstate counterparts or the Victorian Amateur Football Association, as well as the Australian Country Football Championships.

VCFL v VAFA matches
1984: VAFA: 15.10 - 100 d VCFL: 11.15 - 81 at the QE Oval, Bendigo
1985: VCFL: 18.9 - 117 d VAFA: 7.15 - 57 at Mildura Oval
1987: VCFL: 18.11 - 119 v VAFA: 7.13 - 55 at Lavington, NSW. 21/06/87
1993: VAFA: 13.14 - 92 d VCFL: 13.12 - 90 at Elsternwick Park Oval
1995: VAFA: 11.12 - 78 d VCFL: 10.10 - 70 at Morwell
1997: VCFL: 23.16 - 154 d VAFA: 8.9 - 57 at Elsternwick Park Oval
1999: VCFL: 19.14 - 128 d VAFA: 13.12 - 90 at Shell Stadium, Geelong
2001: VAFA: 23.14 - 152 d VCFL: 14.8 - 92 at Elsternwick Park
2003: VAFA: 14.11 - 95 d VCFL: 10.9 - 69 at Barooga, NSW
2005: VCFL: 13.13 - 91 d VAFA: 8.14 - 62 at Elsternwick Park
2007: VCFL: 11.11 - 77 d VAFA: 11.10 - 76 at Eastern Oval, Ballarat
2009: VCFL: 17.8 - 110 d VAFA: 15.16 - 106 at Junction Oval, St. Kilda
2011: VAFA: 13.14 - 92 d VCFL: 13.8 - 86 at Deakin Reserve, Shepparton
2013: VAFA: 11.16 - 82 d AFL Victorian Country: 11.13 - 79 at Junction Oval, St. Kilda
2015: AFL Victorian Country: 17.15 - 117 d VAFA: 8.7 - 55 at QE Oval, Bendigo
2017: VAFA: 24.8 - 152 d AFL Victorian Country: 10.10 - 70 at Frankston City Oval
2019: AFL Victorian Country: 11.15 - 81 d VAFA: 9.10 - 64 at Ikon (Princes) Park, Carlton
2021: No rep football due to COVID-19
2023: ?

VCFL v VFA
1992: VFA: 32.7 - 199 d VCFL: 15.7 - 97. At the Melbourne Cricket Ground. 26th May, 1992.

Affiliated Boards & Leagues
Note: "Major Leagues" are shown in "Bold" / "District Leagues" are shown in "Italic".

Ballarat
 Ballarat Football League (Est. 1893)
 Central Highlands Football League (Est. 1979)

Bendigo
 Bendigo Football League (Est. 1880)
 Heathcote District Football League (Est. 1907)
 Loddon Valley Football League (Est. 1903)
 Maryborough Castlemaine District Football League (Est. 1907)

Central Murray and North Central
 Central Murray Football League (Est. 1997)
 Golden Rivers Football League (Est. 1919)
 North Central Football League (Est. 1930)

East Gippsland
 East Gippsland Football League (Est. 1974)
 Mid Gippsland Football League (Est. 1935)
 North Gippsland Football League (Est. 1955)
 Omeo & District Football League (Est. 1893)

Geelong
 Bellarine Football League (Est. 1971)
 Geelong Football League (Est. 1979)
 Geelong & District Football League (Est. 1879)

Goulburn Murray
 Goulburn Valley Football League (Est. 1894)
 Kyabram & District Football League (Est. 1932)
 Murray Football League (Est. 1931)
 Picola & District Football League (Est. 1934)

Hampden
 Colac & District Football League (Est. 1937)
 Hampden Football Netball League (Est. 1930)
 Warrnambool District Football League (Est. 1946)

Latrobe Valley
 Alberton Football Netball League (Est. 1946)
 Ellinbank & District Football League (Est. 1937)
 Gippsland Football League (Est. 1902)

North East Border
 Ovens & King Football League (Est. 1903)
 Ovens & Murray Football League (Est. 1893)
 Tallangatta & District Football League (Est. 1945)
 Upper Murray Football Netball League (Est. 1893)
 AFLNEB Youth Girls League (Est. 2014)
 Albury Wodonga Junior Football League (Est. ?)
 Wangaratta & District Junior Football League (Est. 1938)

South East
 Mornington Peninsula Nepean Football League (Est. 1987)
 Yarra Valley Mountain District Football and Netball League (Est. 1966)

South West
 Mininera & District Football League (Est. 1925)
 South West District Football League (Est. 1970)
 Western Border Football League (Est. 1964)Sunraysia
 Millewa Football League (Est. 1926) Sunraysia Football League (Est. 1945)

Wimmera
 Horsham & District Football League (Est. 1937) Mallee Football League (Est. 1997)''
 Wimmera Football League (Est. 1937)

References

External links
Official AFL Victoria Country website
 VCFL History

Australian rules football governing bodies
Australian rules football in Victoria (Australia)